Pah is a village and former non-salute Rajput princely state on Saurashtra peninsula in Gujarat, western India.

History 
Pah was a single village princely state in Gohelwar prant, under Sarvaiya Rajput Chieftains.

It had a population of 273 in 1901, yielding a state revenue of 2,600 Rupees (nearly all from land; 1903-4) and paying 319 Rupees tribute to the Gaekwar Baroda State and Junagadh.

During the British Raj, the petty state was under the colonial Eastern Kathiawar Agency.

External links and sources 
History
 DSAL.UChicago - Kathiawar

Princely states of Gujarat
Rajput princely states